Bear Creek Spire is a mountain in the Sierra Nevada in Inyo County, California, in the western United States, and is the 46th highest mountain in California and the 225th highest mountain in the United States. Bear Creek Spire is part of the John Muir Wilderness and the Inyo National Forest.

History 
Bear Creek Spire was named in 1908 by Joseph LeConte, James Hutchinson and Duncan McDuffie, because of its position at the head of the Hilgard Branch of Bear Creek.

Climbing 
The first ascent of Bear Creek Spire was a solo climb by Hermann Ulrichs in 1923 up its west face.
Norman Clyde established the Northeast Face route in October 1931 and a route up the Northeast Buttress in May 1932.

References 

Sierra Nevada (United States)